Season 7 of the Indian competitive reality TV series MasterChef India premiered on Sony Entertainment Television on 2 January 2023 and aired from Monday through Friday at 9 pm IST. 

Vikas Khanna and Ranveer Brar returned as one of the judges for the show while Vineet Bhatia was replaced by Garima Arora.  

This season marked Khanna's sixth consecutive season serving as a judge on the show and Brar's third season.
Similar to the past seasons, Amul remained the title sponsor of the show.  The Masterchef India season 7 was announced on 14th August 2022 on Sony TV Channel and audition rounds were conducted in 4 cities across the country- Kolkata (24th September), Delhi (1st October), Hyderabad (8th October) and Mumbai 15th October).

Format 
A large number of home cooks appeared at the nationwide auditions, of which 36 cooks were selected by Masterchef India Judges and welcomed at the Masterchef Kitchen. They competed in a cook-off to win the final 16 spots.

List of Top 36

Top 16 
The top 16 contestants were revealed on 6 January 2023.

Elimination Table

 (WINNER) The cook won the competition.
 (RUNNER-UP) The cook finished in the second place.
 (WIN) The cook won the Mystery Box challenge, or any other individual / pair challenge.
 (WIN) The cook was on the winning team in the Team Challenge and directly advanced to the next round.
 (TOP) The cook was one of the top entries in the individual challenge.
 (IMN) The cook won an Immunity Pin in a given challenge.
 (SAFE) The cook didn't participate in the challenge as he/she already advanced to the next round.
 (IN) The cook wasn't selected as a top or bottom entry in an individual / pair challenge.
 (IN) The cook wasn't selected as a top or bottom entry in a team challenge.
 (PT) The cook competed in the Elimination Test, and advanced.
 (LOSE) The cook was on the losing team in the Team Challenge and had to compete in the upcoming elimination challenge.
 (WEAK) The cook was one of the bottom entries in an individual challenge.
 (BTM) The cook was one of the bottom entries in an individual challenge and had to compete in the upcoming elimination challenge.
 (X) This cook did not participate in the challenge(s).
 (ELIM) The cook was eliminated from MasterChef Kitchen.
 (VIS) The cook returned to MasterChef Kitchen as Visitor Appearance and participated in a challenge.

Controversies
The season was marked by a series of controversies, including:

The season first landed in controversy when home cook Aruna Vijay, who is a vegetarian, was allowed to cook paneer as a substitute for fish. Audience termed this move as biasedness and favoritism towards Aruna.
Homecook Aruna Vijay’s dish was selected in Top 3, wherein she had made "Appam Stew". Netizens alleged that it was a 'plain looking' dish and saw this as an act of biasedness and how it appeared as though the show was fixed.

Episodes

Notes

References

External links
 MasterChef India Season 7 on SonyLIV

MasterChef India
2023 Indian television seasons